Gorakhpur Junction railway station (station code:GKP) is located in the city of Gorakhpur in the Indian state of Uttar Pradesh. It has the world's second longest railway platform after Hubli Junction railway station. in Karnataka. It serves as the headquarters of the North Eastern Railway, part of Indian Railways. The station offers Class A-1 railway station facilities.

Gorakhpur Junction railway station is a major railway station in the state of Uttar Pradesh especially in the Purvanchal region (Eastern Uttar Pradesh) and it connects Eastern Uttar Pradesh to Bihar, Nepal and Northern India to Bihar.

History

The  metre-gauge Gonda loop, running between Gorakhpur and Gonda, was constructed by the Bengal and North Western Railway between 1886 and 1905. The  Kaptanganj–Siwan metre-gauge line was opened in 1913. The  metre-gauge Nautanwa branch line was opened in 1925.

Conversion to  broad gauge started with the Gorakhpur–Siwan section in 1981. The Gorakhpur–Paniyahwa section was converted in 1991. The Gorakhpur–Gonda loop was converted around 1985, and the Nautanwa branch line at about the same time. The Kaptanganj–Siwan line was converted around 2011
.

Longest platform in the world
A remodeling of the Gorakhpur railway station was launched in 2009. The remodeling work was completed on war-footing within the scheduled time. This is world's second longest railway platform.

Passenger movement
Gorakhpur is amongst the top hundred booking stations of Indian Railways.  It handles over 190 trains daily. On some special occasions the number of trains increases upto 473. Some of the other railway stations in Uttar Pradesh handling large numbers of passengers are Kanpur Central, Varanasi Junction, Mathura Junction and Mughalsarai.

References

External links 
 About Gorakhpur Railway station

Lucknow NER railway division
Railway junction stations in Uttar Pradesh
Railway stations in Gorakhpur
Railway stations opened in 1930